The Gus (lit. goose) is a river in Vladimir and Ryazan Oblasts, Russia. It is a left tributary of the Oka.

The names of several inhabited localities locating along the river's bank are derived from the river's name (Gus-Khrustalny, Gusevsky, Gus-Zhelezny, Gus-Parakhino, Gusevsky Pogost). Charus, Iberdus etc.) also derive.

On the river Gus the Gus Crystal plant is located. It is world-famous production site of original Russian crystal which gave the name to the Gus-Khrustalny city.

References

Rivers of Vladimir Oblast
Rivers of Ryazan Oblast